ECER may refer to:

East Coast Economic Region, an economic region in Malaysia
European Conference on Educational Research, an annual event held by the European Educational Research Association
European Congress of Ethnic Religions, a neopagan organization